Strophosoma melanogrammum is a species of weevil that is native to Europe, but has been introduced into North America as well.

References

External links
Images representing Strophosoma  at BOLD

Curculionidae
Beetles described in 1771
Beetles of Europe
Taxa named by Johann Reinhold Forster